Meadow Valley may refer to:

Places
United States
Meadow Valley (Arizona), a valley in Santa Cruz County, Arizona
Meadow Valley (basin), a basin between the California/Nevada state line and Peavine Mountain
Meadow Valley, Idaho
Meadow Valley (Nevada), the location of Meadow Valley Wash
Meadow Valley, California, a census-designated place
Meadow Valley, Utah, a populated place in Salt Lake County, Utah
Meadow Valley, Wisconsin, an unincorporated community in Juneau County, Wisconsin
Meadow Valley Park, Illinois, a recreation area in Tazewell County, Illinois